The 2020 Canadian Touring Car Championship (known as CTCC presented by Pirelli for sponsorship reasons) is the thirteenth season of the Canadian Touring Car Championship. The season started on 25 July 2020 at the Canadian Tire Motorsport Park and is scheduled to end on 30 August 2020 at the Calabogie Motorsports Park.

Zachary Vanier won in the TCR class, while Orey Fidani won in GT class.

Teams and drivers 
All teams are Canadian-registered. Pirelli is the official tyre supplier.

Calendar and results 
A provisional calendar was announced on 24 December 2019 with 12 races across Canada and the United States. Due to the COVID-19 pandemic the calendar was shortened to just six races across Canada.

References

External links 
 

Canadian Touring Car Championship